Hopton is a civil parish in the Derbyshire Dales district of Derbyshire, England.  The parish contains 21 listed buildings that are recorded in the National Heritage List for England.   All the listed buildings are designated at Grade II, the lowest of the three grades, which is applied to "buildings of national importance and special interest". The parish contains the village of Hopton and the surrounding countryside.  Most of the listed buildings are houses, cottages and associated structures, farmhouses and farm buildings.  The other listed buildings include a guide post, a row of almshouses, the base of a former windmill, a well, and a railway bridge.


Buildings

References

Citations

Sources

 

Lists of listed buildings in Derbyshire